Katie Ford is a Canadian-American film and television writer. She was born in New York City, but spent much of her childhood living in Toronto, Ontario, Canada. Her aunt was actor Constance Ford.

Her credits include the film Miss Congeniality, the television movies Lucy, Little House on the Prairie, and Prayers for Bobby, and the television series Family Ties, Material World, Rugrats, Desperate Housewives, Working the Engels and Michael: Tuesdays and Thursdays.

She is an out lesbian.

References

External links

Film producers from Ontario
Canadian television producers
Canadian television writers
Film producers from New York (state)
Screenwriters from New York (state)
Television producers from New York City
American women television producers
American television writers
Living people
American LGBT screenwriters
Canadian LGBT screenwriters
Canadian lesbian writers
American women screenwriters
American women television writers
Year of birth missing (living people)
Writers from New York City
Canadian women screenwriters
Canadian women film producers
20th-century Canadian screenwriters
21st-century Canadian screenwriters
American women film producers
20th-century American women writers
21st-century American women writers
20th-century Canadian women writers
Canadian women television writers
Canadian women television producers
American lesbian writers
Lesbian screenwriters
21st-century Canadian LGBT people
20th-century Canadian LGBT people